Federal Highway 136 (Carretera Federal 136) is a Federal Highway of Mexico. The highway travels from Zacatepec, Puebla in the east to Los Reyes Acaquilpan, State of Mexico in the west.

References

136